Philip Oliver is the name of:

 Philip Oliver (British politician) (1884–1954), British politician
 Philip Oliver (cricketer) (born 1956), English cricketer
 Philip Oliver (Irish politician) (c. 1720–1768), MP for Kilmallock
 Philip Oliver, one of the Oliver Twins (born 1969), developer of computer games

See also 
 Philip Olivier (born 1980), English actor and model